Old Watson Homestead House, also known as Rowe Residence, is a historic home located at Smithtown, Monongalia County, West Virginia. It is a two-story, "L"-shaped Federal style brick dwelling with Italianate details. The original house was built about 1803, with two additions, one completed about 1843 and another in the late 1850s.  It is one of Monongalia County's oldest and most significant homes.

It was listed on the National Register of Historic Places in 1984.

References

Houses on the National Register of Historic Places in West Virginia
Federal architecture in West Virginia
Italianate architecture in West Virginia
Houses completed in 1803
Houses in Morgantown, West Virginia
National Register of Historic Places in Monongalia County, West Virginia